Vice Admiral Sir Henry Kellett,  (2 November 1806 – 1 March 1875) was a British naval officer and explorer.

Career
Born at Clonacody in Tipperary County, Ireland, on 2 November 1806, Kellett joined the Royal Navy in 1822.

In 1845 Kellett was appointed captain of the survey ship  as part of a hydrography survey mission, the primary objective of which was to survey the coast of the Americas from Guayaquil to Vancouver, including the Galápagos Islands. He was temporarily reassigned in 1848 to join the search for Sir John Franklin. During this voyage he sailed through the Bering Strait across the Chukchi Sea and discovered Herald Island. Kellett landed on Herald Island and named it after his ship. He also sighted Wrangel Island in the western horizon. William Pullen was on this expedition. In 1852, he commanded  and went to the aid of Robert McClure, whose vessel, Investigator, was trapped in the Arctic. His men constructed a storehouse on Dealy Island off the south coast of Melville Island.

Kellett became Senior Officer in the West Indies in 1855 and superintended Jamaica Dockyard. He served as Admiral Superintendent of the Malta Dockyard in 1864 and Commander-in-Chief, China Station in 1869. Kellett retired in 1871. His final years were spent at Clonacody, where he died on 1 March 1875.

Legacy
Several places in Hong Kong have been named after him: Kellett Island, Kellett Bay and Mount Kellett. Kellett Bluff on Henry Island, Washington, USA, was probably named after Captain Kellett as well. It is a place with extreme currents, views, and is frequented by feeding orcas. Kellet's whelk Kelletia kelletii is named after him. On Bank's Island in the Canadian Arctic, Cape Kellett and the Kellett River are named after him.

References

 This article is based on a translation of the article Henry Kellett from the French Wikipedia on 13 December 2006.

Further reading

 

|-

1806 births
1875 deaths
British explorers
19th-century explorers
Royal Navy vice admirals
Explorers of Canada
Explorers of the Arctic
Chukchi Sea
British military personnel of the First Opium War
People from County Tipperary
British polar explorers
Knights Commander of the Order of the Bath